Vinita Township is a township in Kingman County, Kansas, USA.  As of the 2000 census, its population was 249.

Geography
Vinita Township covers an area of 35.31 square miles (91.46 square kilometers); of this, 0.24 square miles (0.62 square kilometers) or 0.68 percent is water. The streams of Fish Creek and Smoots Creek run through this township.

Unincorporated towns
 Lansdowne
(This list is based on USGS data and may include former settlements.)

Adjacent townships
 Evan Township (north)
 Morton Township, Sedgwick County (east)
 Erie Township, Sedgwick County (southeast)
 Allen Township (south)
 Eagle Township (southwest)
 Dale Township (west)
 Galesburg Township (northwest)

Cemeteries
The township contains one cemetery, Vinita.

References
 U.S. Board on Geographic Names (GNIS)
 United States Census Bureau cartographic boundary files

External links
 City-Data.com

Townships in Kingman County, Kansas
Townships in Kansas